Events in the year 1857 in Iceland.

Incumbents 

 Monarch: Frederick VII of Denmark
 Council President of Denmark: Carl Christian Hall

Events 

 Krýsuvíkurkirkja was constructed in Krýsuvík.

Births 

 16 November − Jón Sveinsson, writer.

References 

 
1850s in Iceland
Years of the 19th century in Iceland
Iceland
Iceland